Entertainment is a 2014 Indian Hindi-language action comedy film written and directed by screenwriter duo Sajid-Farhad and produced by Ramesh S. Taurani under Tips Industries Limited banner. Based on an original story by K. Subash, the film stars Junior - The wonder dog as the titular protagonist and Akshay Kumar, along with Tamannaah, Mithun Chakraborty, Johnny Lever, Prakash Raj and Sonu Sood. The film was released on 8 August 2014. Receiving mixed reviews from critics, it became a commercial failure.

Plot 
The film starts with Akhil Lokhande (Akshay Kumar) getting paid for doing an ad, where he gets into a fight, as he wasn't paid the full amount of money that they had promised. This continues with a few other assignments, where Akhil constantly gets underpaid, resulting in a fight, ends the fight when he gets a phone call, and says he has to go somewhere. He then arrives on a shoot where Sakshi (Tamannaah) is shooting for her television series. After her shoot lets out, they go for a walk around the park, observing other couples. At the end of their walk, Akhil proposes Sakshi. Akhil and Saakshi go to her father's (Mithun Chakraborty) house, where they are told that until Akhil becomes rich, he can't marry Sakshi.

Akhil goes to his film-obsessed friend, Jugnu's (Krushna Abhishek) shop. He tells him that he is going to visit his father at the hospital because he has chest pain. However, his father Mr. Lokhande (Darshan Jariwala), is actually acting and is dancing around with the nurse, only staying in the hospital because it has service like a 5-star hotel. Akhil arrives just in time to hear and see this, and goes to beat up Mr. Lokhande when he reveals that Akhil is adopted and his real father wasn't ready for a child so his mother left, but was killed in a train crash. Luckily Akhil survived, and when the railway officers were giving one lakh rupees for the families who are even one member dies, he adopted Akhil to claim the compensation. Akhil, in a fit of rage, beats him up. He goes back to his house, and opens the chest that he never had before, which contains love letters from his real father, to his mother, and a locket with his father and mother's pictures. He discovers that his father is Pannalal Johri (Dalip Tahil) who is a billionaire in Bangkok. Right as he finds this, on the television comes news that Pannalal Johri is dead and his 30 billion's($480,000,000 in 2014) will go to anyone who can prove that they are related to Pannalal Johri.

After arriving at his father's house at Bangkok, Pannalal Johri's lawyer (Johny Lever) tells Akhil  that a dog named 'Entertainment' is the owner of Johri's property, and is actually Johri's pet dog. He relays this to Jugnu, and they try to kill Entertainment, by having Akhil become Entertainment's caretaker, but fail. Saakshi and her father surprise Akhil at the mansion, and discover that Entertainment is the heir, causing the father to declare that Saakshi will never marry Akhil. At this time 2 brothers, Karan Johri (Prakash Raj) and Arjun Johri (Sonu Sood), the 2nd cousins of Johri, escape jail. Karan and Arjun want to kill Akhil, because they figure that the dog will die in a couple of years anyway, and thus while Akhil is attempting to kill Entertainment, they do the same to Akhil by drowning him under a thinly iced lake. Karan and Arjun hit the ground at the same time as Akhil causing him to nearly fall in, but Entertainment saves the former, and falls into the lake instead. After a lot of efforts, Akhil fails to save Entertainment but he comes out of the water and survives. Akhil realizes his mistake and learns that Entertainment is a good hearted dog so he becomes his friend and leaves the mansion. Karan and Arjun, citing their legal connections very well, inappropriately acquire the property from Entertainment.

Akhil learns this news and returns. He vows that he'll get the property back for Entertainment. Akhil's strategy is to divide the two brothers and conquer. He manages to get a job as a servant at the mansion, now owned by Karan and Arjun. Akhil attempts to split the two brothers, first by introducing Saakshi who pretends to love the two brothers separately. However, the scheme fails. Akhil again attempts trying to split the two brothers, this time by introducing a false impression of a ghost of Entertainment the dog. The two brothers quarrel and accuse each other of illegally disguising as Entertainment and having tricked the other. Akhil's friends tape this conversation in a CD slyly, however, the CD drops accidentally and Karan and Arjun realize that all this was planned by Akhil.

Entertainment runs with the CD. Karan, Arjun and their gang chase the dog, Akhil, and his friends. Akhil manages to beat them all. Later, Karan shoots Akhil, but Entertainment takes the bullet by jumping in front of Akhil. Akhil gets angry and beats up Karan and Arjun black and blue.

Entertainment is taken to the hospital but is unable to come back to life. Akhil, in a fit of anger, punches him but at this process, he had saved him. Karan and Arjun come to apologize to Entertainment, who forgives them. Sakshi's father gets Akhil and Sakshi married while Entertainment also marries a female dog in the same ceremony. This film ends when it shows that Akhil Johri and Saakshi Johri live a life with Entertainment and his wife (the female dog) with both of them having Kids and finally at the end it shows the social message Love your pets and they will entertain you all your life.

Cast 
 Akshay Kumar as Akhil Lokhande, Pannalal Johari's biological son
 Tamannaah as Sakshi 
 Krushna Abhishek as Jugnu 
 Dalip Tahil as Pannalal Johari, Akhil's biological father 
 Johnny Lever as Habbibullah, Pannalal's lawyer
 Prakash Raj as Karan Singh Johari,  Pannalal's nephew
 Sonu Sood as Arjun Singh Johari,  Pannalal's nephew
 Mithun Chakraborty as Sakshi's father

Cameos and guest appearances 
 Riteish Deshmukh as TV host (cameo)
 Shreyas Talpade as cricketer (cameo)
 Remo D'Souza as a choreographer (cameo)
 Vrajesh Hirjee as wannabe groom (cameo)
 Darshan Jariwala as Mr. Lokhande ; Akhil's adoptive father (cameo)
 Hiten Tejwani as the show actor (cameo)
 Sajid-Farhad as commentators (cameo)
Yo Yo Honey Singh as Akhil's Sidekick (cameo)
 Kashmera Shah as Jugnu's Bride (Special Appearance)

Production 

While working on Phata Poster Nikhla Hero in June 2013 producer Ramesh Taurani confirmed that the film's cast will include Kumar, Bhatia, Chakraborty, Sood, Prakash Raj, Lever and Abhishek.

In February 2013, Taurani confirmed that the film will feature Kumar in the lead role. Bhatia's involvement with the project was confirmed the following month. In April, Taurani confirmed that Sonu Sood and Prakash Raj will be playing the antagonists and that Johnny Lever was also part of the project. Sood had earlier acted alongside Kumar in the comedy drama Singh Is Kinng. The film was tentatively titled Entertainment. In an interview, Sajid-Farhad said that Kumar had motivated them to start their directing career. They said that they had prepared the script for their directorial venture a long time ago. Shooting started on 3 June 2013 in Mumbai where the mahurat shot was filmed. Television actor Hiten Tejwani also did a special appearance as a TV presenter. An audition was conducted in Bangkok for the role of the dog–Entertainment. A Golden Retriever named Wonder Dog was chosen from a total of 50 dogs to play the role. In June 2013, the producers, directors and Kumar discussed about shooting locations. Kumar expressed his wish to shoot the film in Bangkok, where he had worked as a waiter and trained in martial arts. The finalised locations included Baanpradhana Bungalow in Ongkuruk, Asiatique Mall, Ancient City, Bangkok University and Ongkuruk Railway Station.

The film was scheduled to premiere on 28 March 2014. On 1 July, shooting started in Bangkok for a three months long schedule where 80% of the film was shot, remaining 10% of the film was shot in Mumbai with one song in Goa during late 2013. The shooting was wrapped up in April 2014. A few songs and an item number were shot in Mumbai. The Censor Board of Film Certification in India had objected to Abdullah, the name of Johnny Lever's character in the film. The board's objection was based on the fact that the name of the character is sacred and it was mispronounced by several other characters throughout the film and this would have hurt the religious sentiments of people. The board had asked Sajid Farhad to change the character's name. They complied with the board's instructions and changed the name to Habibullah. The changes were made just a week before the release of the film. The board had also objected to using the word HIV during a joke in the film and subsequently, it was muted. Another of the board's objection was the use of trident by Kumar's character in the film. The shot was removed.

All the costumes used in the filming were donated to the youth organization in Defense of Animals. It auctioned the clothes and the money collected in this way was used for the benefit of stray animals. Kumar also bought one clothing item. The lead actress Tammanah Bhatia stated that she would donate all the costumes used by her in her future film projects to such initiatives. Earlier titled It's Entertainment, the teaser trailer of the movie unveiled on 14 May whilst the theatrical trailer was released on 19 May. Politician and animal rights activist Maneka Gandhi was the chief guest at the trailer launch ceremony. The producers initially wanted the film to be titled Entertainment but Amole Gupte had already registered for his upcoming film but in July 2014 Gupte donated it to the Sajid-Farhad as a friendly gesture. Kumar decided that the credit for the dog Junior should appear before his. Some fraudsters released a poster of the film and invited people to attend the music launch at Birla Matoshree. Producer Taurani warned people about the fraud posters. The film's satellite right were sold to Zee TV; though the producers did not disclose the amount, media speculated that the deal was worth .

Soundtrack 

The soundtrack is composed by Sachin–Jigar, with their new A&R platform White Noise Productions, including only the duo at that point, composing the background score. This marked the first time the duo worked with Kumar. The song "Teri Mahima Aprampar" was taken from the Telugu film D for Dopidi. Kumar also sang one of the tracks of the film. The YouTube link of the making of the song was uploaded on Twitter.

The party single "Johnny Johnny" was released first. Based on a nursery rhyme, the song featured Kumar lip-synching to a female voice. The directors said about the song "...in a small subtle way, we are showing our support for women empowerment". Sunitra Pacheco of The Indian Express said that it had "all the ingredients to become a new party anthem". In a review for Rediff.com Joginder Tuteja said that the film's music "is entertaining, providing good fun at a frantic pace." He called "Veerey Di Wedding" "an infectious number" and praised Mika's voice. About the song "Johnny Johnny", he said, "it has addictive beats that get you hooked at the first listening" and praised the lyrics and singers. He added that the song "will be played for many months, till the next New Year party at least."

Critical reception 

Meena Iyer of The Times of India praised the film's humour, Kumar's performance and his chemistry with Junior, especially in comic scenes. She stated that though the dog was not a good actor yet "his eyes can melt your heart." She said that the directors could have kept the film "tight". Mihir Fadnavis of Firstpost called it a "sheer genius" and said that it was Kumar's funniest film since Hera Pheri. He wrote that the film satirised all of the Sajid-Farhad films and took "potshots at everything that is wrong with desi cinema and television." He also appreciated the scene transitions and called it "technically great." Hindustan Times Sweta Kaushal criticised the screenplay, Kumar and Prakash Raj's acting. She said that Bhatia "[did not] have much to do" and Chakraborty did not have much screenspace. However, she praised Abhishek's comedy and said that it was the "[only] bright spark in the film." She concluded her review by saying that the film was neither a "great piece of art" nor entertaining. Prior to the film's release, Hindustan Times published an article titled Four reasons why you shouldn't waste your time on Entertainment and criticised the film's story, songs and dialogues. Shubha Shetty-Saha of Mid-Day wrote "Entertainment pleasantly surprises with its delightful absurdity and sure gets you roaring with laughter at several points." She called it a child friendly film and appreciated the dialogues and the performance given by the actors. However, Saha stated that the pace of the film's second half was slowed down by the excessive melodrama. Writing for The Indian Express, Shubhra Gupta called the film "dull and loud". She criticised the film's story and dialogues. Rohit Khilnani of India Today appreciated Kumar, Bhatia and Lever's performance and wrote that the rest of the cast was wasted. He criticised the plot and called it "senseless and full of loopholes."

Sukanya Verma of Rediff.com wrote "Entertainment is unapologetically filmi in its trappings, treatment, thought." She further wrote that the film was "mostly a garrulous, occasionally comical farce that intermittently serves as reminder that in the search of "entertainment, entertainment, entertainment" one can always rely on the delightfully loony Johnny Lever." Gayatri Sankar of Zee News called Kumar's acting one of the best comic performances he had given so far. She also appreciated the film's screenplay, cinematography, dialogues and the actor's portrayal of their respective characters. She wrote that a few of the songs could have been removed and the directors had succeeded in giving the message of treating "animals with respect and love". Writing for CNN-IBN, Rajeev Masand termed the film's humour repetitive and lazy. He criticised the film's story but appreciated Lever's performance by calling him "the single saving grace in this overcooked, misguided comedy". In his review for Bollywood Hungama, critic Taran Adarsh praised the humorous writing and the comedic acting talents of the actors. He called the film "a joy ride that lives up to its title." However, Daily News and Analysis called it a commercial failure and Tamannah Bhatia's third disaster in a row.

Box office 

Entertainment was a commercial failure, earning  worldwide at the box office.

The film released on 8 August and collected  on the same day. However, the performance at multiplexes in metropolitan areas was low. During its first weekend it managed to gross  and Indian film website Bollywood Hungama declared it Akshay Kumar's 7th highest opening weekend grosser. Entertainment recorded the ninth highest opening weekend collection of 2014. In its first week the film grossed  at the Indian Box office.

It grossed  on its second Friday, which was a national holiday. The film received tough competition from Ajay Devgan starrer Singham Returns which released on the same day. Entertainment was declared a hit film and trade analysts expected that it would be able to gross  during its total run. In its second weekend it added approx.  more to its total collection. Till second week the film's total collection had reached approx. . The film's producer Ramesh Taurani expected the film to do better business but was happy with the overall performance.

References

External links 
 
 

2014 films
2014 action comedy films
2010s Hindi-language films
Indian action comedy films
Films set in Thailand
Films set in India
Indian slapstick comedy films
Films about dogs
Films shot in Bangkok
Films shot in Mumbai
2014 comedy films
Films about pets
Films directed by Farhad Samji